Defending champion Novak Djokovic defeated Juan Martín del Potro in the final, 6–1, 3–6, 7–6(7–3) to win the singles tennis title at the 2013 Shanghai Masters.

Seeds
The top eight seeds receive a bye into the second round.

Draw

Finals

Top half

Section 1

Section 2

Bottom half

Section 3

Section 4

Qualifying

Seeds

Qualifiers

Qualifying draw

First qualifier

Second qualifier

Third qualifier

Fourth qualifier

Fifth qualifier

Sixth qualifier

Seventh qualifier

References
 Main Draw
 Qualifying Draw

Shanghai Rolex Masters - Singles
2013 Shanghai Rolex Masters